The 3rd Battalion, Parachute Regiment (3 PARA), is a battalion sized formation of the British Army's Parachute Regiment and is a subordinate unit within 16 Air Assault Brigade.

Roled as an Airborne light infantry unit, the battalion is capable of a wide range of operational taskings. Based at Merville Barracks, Colchester Garrison, their barracks in England, personnel regularly deploy outside of the United Kingdom on operations and training.

A unique part of the 3rd Battalion is the inclusion of the Guards Parachute Platoon, which is incorporated into B Company and also known as 6 (Guards) Platoon. The Guards Parachute Platoon is made up of volunteers who have passed P Company from the five Regiments of Foot Guards and Infantry qualified members of the Household Cavalry; they can be distinguished from other paratroopers by a "blue red blue" patch sewn to their beret beneath the Parachute Regiment cap badge.

History

Background
Impressed by the success of German airborne operations during the Battle of France, the British Prime Minister, Winston Churchill, directed the War Office to investigate the possibility of creating a corps of 5,000 parachute troops. On 22 June 1940, No. 2 Commando was redeployed to parachute duties and on 21 November re-designated the 11th Special Air Service Battalion, with both a parachute and glider wing, the men of which took part in the first British airborne operation, Operation Colossus, on 10 February 1941. The success of the raid prompted the War Office to expand the airborne forces, setting up the Airborne Forces Depot and Battle School in Derbyshire in April 1942, and creating the Parachute Regiment as well as converting a number of infantry battalions into airborne battalions or platoons in August 1942.

All parachute forces had to undergo a twelve-day parachute training course at No. 1 Parachute Training School, RAF Ringway. Initial parachute jumps were from a converted barrage balloon and finished with five jumps from an aircraft. Anyone failing to complete a descent was returned to his old unit. Those men who successfully completed the parachute course were presented with their maroon beret and parachute wings.

Airborne soldiers were expected to fight against superior numbers of the enemy armed with heavy weapons, including artillery and tanks. Training was as a result designed to encourage a spirit of self-discipline, self-reliance and aggressiveness. Emphasis was given to physical fitness, marksmanship and fieldcraft. A large part of the training regime consisted of assault courses and route marching while military exercises included capturing and holding airborne bridgeheads, road or rail bridges and coastal fortifications. At the end of most exercises, the battalions would march back to their barracks.

There was a wide spread rumour that started circulating about the 3rd Battalion that they would often defecate into the boots of men in other battalions as a sort of practical joke. This rumour was found to be true when an officer of the regiment discovered human excrement in his shoe, no one was found guilty of the prank however until a couple of years later where Michael Smith (1st Battalion), caught Sam Bowyer (3rd Battalion) placing human excrement into his boots.

3rd Battalion
The 3rd Parachute Battalion was formed in 1941 from volunteers from various infantry regiments. It became part of the 1st Parachute Brigade, later part of the 1st Airborne Division. The battalion first saw action during the Operation Torch landings, and then further operations in North Africa, by the independent 1st Parachute Brigade. After the Tunisian campaign, the battalion and brigade rejoined the 1st Airborne Division, and took part in Operation Fustian in Sicily, and Operation Slapstick on the Italian mainland.

Withdrawn to Britain with the rest of the 1st Airborne Division, the next mission was during Operation Market Garden and the Battle of Arnhem, during which the battalion was virtually wiped out. Afterwards, the battalion was reformed but never saw any further action during the Second World War, though it may have gone to Norway with the initial reoccupation force in 1945. The battalion was then assigned to the 3rd Parachute Brigade in the 6th Airborne Division and served with them in Palestine. The battalion was disbanded in 1948, but was reformed by the re-numbering of the 7th (Light Infantry) Parachute Battalion as the 3rd at Itzehoe in July 1948.

The battalion was deployed in Northern Ireland 12 times between 1971 and 2004, during the Troubles. In the summer of 1976, it was based in South County Armagh, where complaints were made of its treatment of residents.

In 1981, it joined 5th Infantry Brigade at Aldershot on the reconversion of British Army Field Forces back into brigades. In 1982, it was hurriedly transferred to 3 Commando Brigade, along with 2 PARA, to reinforce that brigade ahead of the Task Force's sailing for the Falklands Conflict. After marching 50 miles across the islands, the Battalion saw action on 11/12 June when it was engaged in the Battle of Mount Longdon.

In 2006 3 PARA battle group was deployed to Helmand Province in Afghanistan. As the first NATO troops to enter Helmand they were soon engaged in some of the heaviest fighting the British Army had seen since the Korean War. On 4 September 2006, four Soviet anti-personnel mines, undetonated since the 1979-1989 Soviet–Afghan War, were set off by members of 3PARA in what became known as the Kajaki Dam Incident. There was a single fatality and seven others were left with seriously life-threatening injuries.

In October 2013, 3 PARA took part in a large training exercise to return to the Airborne Assault role.

In September 2014, a comprehensive history of the battalion, with numerous links to photos, obituaries and more was founded – the creation of Paradata, a 'living history' of the Parachute Regiment and Airborne Forces

3 PARA trained with its anti-tank platoon to take on the Air Assault Task Force (AATF) role from May 2014, with the unit's airborne infantry bolstered by artillery, engineers, medics and logisticians from 16 Air Assault Brigade.

In 2018, over 80 members of 3 PARA were sent to Afghanistan as part of the Resolute Support Mission, to protect military and civilian advisors working in government ministries and work as advisors at the Afghan National Army Officers' Academy, alongside the 1st Battalion Royal Gurkha Rifles.

In April 2019 the battalion was investigated by the Ministry of Defence when a video circulated on social media showing four members of 3 PARA firing simulation weapons at an image of Labour leader and Leader of the Opposition Jeremy Corbyn.

On 7 June 2022, the Chief of the General Staff, Sir Patrick Sanders, took the decision to cancel an overseas deployment by the battalion after a number of incidents which demonstrated a poor standard of discipline in the battalion. The minister, James Heappey, was said to be "sorry and embarrassed" by the "disgraceful" behaviour.

See also
 1st Battalion, Parachute Regiment
 2nd Battalion, Parachute Regiment
 4th Battalion, Parachute Regiment
 List of Second World War British airborne battalions

Notes
Footnotes

Citations

References

External links

 Parachute Regiment War Dead
 Exairborne Forces history page
 British Army Locations 1945
 3 PARA, Freedom of the City of London Parade 2010 (Photographic account).

1941 establishments in the United Kingdom
British Parachute Regiment Battalions
Military units and formations established in 1941
Military units and formations disestablished in 1948
Military units and formations established in 1948
Airborne units and formations of the United Kingdom